Enoch Greenleafe Parrott (December 10, 1814 – May 10, 1879) was an American naval officer who fought in the Mexican-American War and Civil War, later rising to the rank of rear admiral.

Biography
Parrott was born in Portsmouth, New Hampshire, on December 10, 1814. He entered the United States Navy in 1831 as a midshipman, and was promoted to lieutenant in 1841.

In 1843 he took part in the anti-slavery expedition of Commander Matthew C. Perry's Africa Squadron.

During the Mexican-American War he served aboard the 52-gun frigate , and took part in John C. Frémont's expedition from Monterey to Los Angeles, and in the capture of Guaymas and Mazatlán.

Parrott was commissioned as commander in 1861 at the beginning of the Civil War, and was involved in the destruction of Norfolk Navy Yard before it could be taken over by the Confederacy.

In the brig  he captured the Confederate privateer Savannah, for which he received the commendation of the Navy Department. He commanded the steamer  from 1861 to 1863, participating in the battle of Port Royal, and engaged the Confederate rams Palmetto State and Chicora at the time of their sortie from Charleston on January 31, 1863.

Parrot was in command of the monitor  of the North Atlantic squadron in the engagements with the ironclads on the James River in 1864, and in the fights with Howett's battery.

Parrott was promoted to captain in 1866, to commodore in 1870, and to rear admiral in 1873. He retired in 1874.

Parrott died in New York City on May 10, 1879, and is buried at St. John's church in Portsmouth, New Hampshire.

References

1814 births
1879 deaths
American military personnel of the Mexican–American War
Burials in New Hampshire
People from Portsmouth, New Hampshire
Union Navy officers
United States Navy admirals